Alto do Pina was a Portuguese parish, located in the municipality of Lisbon. It had a population of 10,253 inhabitants and a total area of 0.82 km².
With the 2012 Administrative Reform, the parish merged with the São João de Deus parish into a new one named Areeiro.

Local landmarks include the Fonte Luminosa (Glowing Fountain), where a major rally was held by the Portuguese Socialist Party during the post-revolutionary period of 1975, attacking the influence of the Portuguese Communist Party. Also located in Alto do Pina are the ruins of the vacation house of the consort king of Portugal Ferdinand II.

References

External links
Alto do Pina heraldry
List of abandoned buildings in Alto do Pina
Speech of Mário Soares during the rally of the Fonte Luminosa in 1975

Former parishes of Lisbon
2012 disestablishments in Portugal